Emma Township is located in White County, Illinois. As of the 2010 census, its population was 387 and it contained 235 housing units.

Three significant archaeological sites are located in the township: the Hubele Mounds and Village Site southeast of Maunie; the Wilson Mounds and Village Site at Rising Sun; and the Bieker-Wilson Village Site east of New Haven.

Geography

Demographics

References

External links
City-data.com
Illinois State Archives

Townships in White County, Illinois
Townships in Illinois
1871 establishments in Illinois